Regional Council may refer to:
 Regional Council (Hong Kong), disbanded in 1999
 Regional Council (constituency)

Regional council may refer to:
 Regional council (Cameroon)
 Regional council (France), the elected assembly of a region of France
 Regional council (Israel)
 Regional council (Italy), the parliament of a region of Italy
 Regional councils of New Zealand
 Regional councils in Scotland, units of local government abolished in 1996
 Regional Council (Tunisia)
 Governing bodies of regional municipalities in Nova Scotia:
 Cape Breton Regional Council
 Halifax Regional Council
A type of local government area in Australia